Tuka may refer to:

Tuka (rapper), a rapper from the Australian hip-hop group Thundamentals
Christiano "Tuka" Rocha (1982–2019), Brazilian race car driver
Buqa Temür (alternately Tuka Timur), khan of the Chagatai Khanate (1272?-1282)
Tuka, Estonia, village in Lääne-Nigula Parish, Lääne County, Estonia
Tuka (surname)

See also